In complex analysis, a removable singularity of a holomorphic function is a point at which the function is undefined, but it is possible to redefine the function at that point in such a way that the resulting function is regular in a neighbourhood of that point.

For instance, the (unnormalized) sinc function

The resulting function is holomorphic. In this case the problem was caused by  being given an indeterminate form. Taking a power series expansion for  around the singular point shows that

We say  is holomorphically extendable over  if such a  exists.

Riemann's theorem 

Riemann's theorem on removable singularities is as follows:

The implications 1 ⇒ 2  ⇒ 3  ⇒ 4 are trivial. Define

by 4, hence h is holomorphic on D and has a Taylor series about a:

We have c0 = h(a) = 0 and c1 = h(a) = 0; therefore

Hence, where z ≠ a, we have:

However,

is holomorphic on D, thus an extension of f.

Other kinds of singularities 

Unlike functions of a real variable, holomorphic functions are sufficiently rigid that their isolated singularities can be completely classified. A holomorphic function's singularity is either not really a singularity at all, i.e. a removable singularity, or one of the following two types:

In light of Riemann's theorem, given a non-removable singularity, one might ask whether there exists a natural number  such that . So removable singularities are precisely the poles of order 0. A holomorphic function blows up uniformly near its other poles.
The Great Picard Theorem shows that such an  maps every punctured open neighborhood  to the entire complex plane, with the possible exception of at most one point.

See also
 Analytic capacity
 Removable discontinuity

External links 
Removable singular point at Encyclopedia of Mathematics
Analytic functions
Meromorphic functions
Bernhard Riemann